Elections to Kesteven County Council were held on Saturday, 6 March 1937. Kesteven was one of three divisions of the historic county of Lincolnshire in England; it consisted of the ancient wapentakes (or hundreds) of Aswardhurn, Aveland, Beltisloe, Boothby Graffoe, Flaxwell, Langoe, Loveden, Ness, and Winnibriggs and Threo. The Local Government Act 1888 established Kesteven as an administrative county, governed by a Council; elections were held every three years from 1889, until it was abolished by the Local Government Act 1972, which established Lincolnshire County Council in its place.

For the 1937 elections, there were contests in 8 divisions: Ancaster, Billingborough, Bracebridge, Caythorpe, Claypole, Grantham no. 3, Rippingale, and Thurlby. In all of the other divisions, only one candidate was nominated and they were returned unopposed.

Results by division

Sources: 

 "Kesteven County Council: Contests in 8 Divisions". Sleaford Gazette. 26 February 1937. p. 3.
 "Our County Parliaments". Stamford Mercury. 26 February 1937. p. 24.

By-elections

April 1937 
Following the death of H. H. Foster, a Holdingham resident and county councillor for the Sleaford no. 1 division, W. Middleton was returned unopposed for his seat on the county council.

May 1937 
The county councillor for North Hykeham, George William Hackney, died in March 1937 after being kicked by a horse. This prompted a contest to fill the vacancy between George William Hutson, of Hilldersden House, and John Willam Clarke, a former police officer, of Park View, Newark Road. Hutson won with 342 votes against Clarke's 301 (there were 3 spoilt papers).

References

1937
1937 English local elections
20th century in Lincolnshire